Northside Middle School may refer to:

Northside Middle School (Columbus, Indiana)
Northside Middle School, a Houston County School, Texas
Northside Middle School (Norfolk, Virginia)
Northside Middle School (Roanoke, Virginia)

See also
Northside High School (disambiguation)
Northside Independent School District, San Antonio, Texas